Carlos Eduardo Ventura (born 15 March 1974), known as Duda, is a Brazilian retired footballer who played as a forward or right winger.

He spent most of his career in Portugal, most notably with Boavista, amassing Primeira Liga totals of 119 matches and 19 goals over six seasons.

Club career
Born in São Bernardo do Campo, Duda started playing organized football at Sport Club Corinthians Alagoano and, after just one season, in 1997, moved to Portugal with S.L. Benfica, but failed to feature for the latter club in official matches. After a few months in Japan and a brief stint with Rio Ave F.C. he signed with FC Porto, but was also highly unsuccessful there, finishing the 1999–2000 campaign with F.C. Alverca.

Duda had his most steady and successful period with Boavista FC, being one of the most important attacking players in a side that conquered their sole national league title in 2001 (scoring ten Primeira Liga goals), alongside Elpídio Silva and Martelinho. After only 14 appearances in 2003–04, and no league goals whatsoever in his last two years, he returned to Brazil and joined Associação Atlética Internacional (Limeira), switching shortly after to former club Corinthians Alagoano.

After a spell with Associação Atlética Luziânia, Duda moved in January 2008 to Sliema Wanderers F.C. of the Maltese Premier League. This was not his first visit to the country, as he had been to the island while playing at Boavista in a UEFA Champions League second-round qualifier against Hibernians F.C. in August 2003, which ended in a 3–3 draw, with the player himself getting on the scoresheet.

Honours
Porto
Taça de Portugal: 1999–2000

Boavista
Primeira Liga: 2000–01

References

External links

1974 births
Living people
People from São Bernardo do Campo
Brazilian footballers
Association football wingers
Association football forwards
Sport Club Corinthians Alagoano players
Associação Atlética Internacional (Limeira) players
Associação Atlética Luziânia players
Primeira Liga players
S.L. Benfica footballers
FC Porto players
Rio Ave F.C. players
F.C. Alverca players
Boavista F.C. players
J1 League players
Kashiwa Reysol players
Maltese Premier League players
Sliema Wanderers F.C. players
Brazilian expatriate footballers
Expatriate footballers in Portugal
Expatriate footballers in Japan
Expatriate footballers in Malta
Brazilian expatriate sportspeople in Portugal
Brazilian expatriate sportspeople in Japan
Brazilian expatriate sportspeople in Malta
Footballers from São Paulo (state)